The 2017 World Table Tennis Championships men's doubles was the 54th edition of the men's doubles championship.

Xu Xin and Zhang Jike were the defending champions but Zhang did not compete this year.

Fan Zhendong and Xu Xin defeated Masataka Morizono and Yuya Oshima 11–9, 16–14, 11–9, 6–11, 13–11 in the final to win the title.

Seeds
Matches were best of 5 games in qualification and best of 7 games in the 64-player sized main draw.

 Masataka Morizono /  Yuya Oshima (final)
 Patrick Franziska /  Jonathan Groth (third round)
 Fan Zhendong /  Xu Xin (champion)
 Jung Young-sik /  Lee Sang-su (semifinals)
 Hugo Calderano /  Gustavo Tsuboi (third round)
 Alexey Liventsov/  Mikhail Paikov (first round)
 Ho Kwan Kit /  Wong Chun Ting (quarterfinals)
 Kristian Karlsson /  Mattias Karlsson (third round)
 Koki Niwa /  Maharu Yoshimura (semifinals)
 Robin Devos /  Cedric Nuytinck (second round)
 Ruwen Filus/  Ricardo Walther (first round)
 Chen Chien-an /  Liao Cheng-ting (quarterfinals)
 Jang Woo-jin/  Jeong Sang-eun (first round)
 Jakub Dyjas /  Daniel Górak (third round)
 Jiang Tianyi /  Lam Siu Hang (second round)
 Sharath Kamal /  Sathiyan Gnanasekaran (second round)
 Timo Boll /  Ma Long (third round)
 Nándor Ecseki/  Ádám Szudi (first round)
 Quadri Aruna /  Segun Toriola (second round)
 Tristan Flore /  Emmanuel Lebesson (second round)
 Gao Ning /  Pang Xue Jie (third round)
 Nima Alamian /  Noshad Alamian (second round)
 Pär Gerell /  Anton Kallberg (second round)
 Gaston Alto/  Horacio Cifuentes (first round)
 Tomáš Konečný /  Tomaš Polansky (first round)
 El-sayed Lashin/  Ahmed Saleh (first round)
 Brian Afanador/  Daniel González (first round)
 Cristian Pletea /  Hunor Szőcs (second round)
 Eric Jouti/  Cazuo Matsumoto (second round)
 Harmeet Desai /  Soumyajit Ghosh (second round)
 Aleksandar Karakašević /  Wang Zengyi (second round)
 Robert Gardos/  Daniel Habesohn (first round)

Draw

Finals

Top half

Section 1

Section 2

Bottom half

Section 3

Section 4

References

External links
Main draw

Men's doubles